Horror films released in the 1990s are listed in the following articles:
 List of horror films of 1990
 List of horror films of 1991
 List of horror films of 1992
 List of horror films of 1993
 List of horror films of 1994
 List of horror films of 1995
 List of horror films of 1996
 List of horror films of 1997
 List of horror films of 1998
 List of horror films of 1999

1990s
Lists of 1990s films by genre